Punjab Cricket Association is the governing body of the Cricket activities in the state of Punjab and the Union Territory of Chandigarh in India and the Punjab cricket team. It is affiliated to the Board of Control for Cricket in India.

Currently there are two international cricket stadiums (Mohali and Mullanpur) in Punjab under PCA. It has produced great players like Yuvraj Singh , Shubman Gill , Kapil Dev and Harbhajan Singh.

References

Cricket administration in India
Cricket in Punjab, India
Organisations based in Punjab, India
1956 establishments in East Punjab
Sports organizations established in 1956